Global Underground 003: Nick Warren, Live in Prague is a DJ mix album in the Global Underground series, compiled and mixed by Nick Warren. The set was recorded at a gig in Prague, Czech Republic. This is the second and last live recording in the Global Underground series. The subsequent albums are studio recordings inspired by the live sets in the featured cities.

For their second Global Underground release, Boxed chose to record a live set from Nick Warren. Already a well established club DJ in Bristol and around the UK, Warren was just starting to enjoy wider recognition in his production partnership Way Out West too, making him an exciting choice.

It was to be the start of one of the longest running relationships in dance music. Nick has mixed eight editions of the series to date (GU 003, 008, 011, 018, 024, 028, 030, and 035), with a ninth installment planned. His alliance with GU has led him to turn down many offers to mix other compilations, preferring to associate himself fully with the trusted name that first picked up on his work and gave him such a good platform to share it.

His first mix, performed live in the Czech Republic capital, highlighted to many people for the first time that there was a rapidly growing dance scene in the former Eastern Europe. The tracks are a snapshot of 1997, with trance stylings, rolling bass and epic breakdowns.

Track listing

Disc one
 Cruzeman - "The Ohm Sessions" (Coloured Oxygen Reprise) – 3:44
 Nalin & Kane - "Beachball" – 4:30
 Cruzeman - "Tech Theme" – 3:48
 The Coffee Boys - "Nipple Fish" (One Life Remix) – 5:00
 Mikerobenics - "Schattenmund" (Dave Angel Remix) – 4:39
 Aquaplex - "Spirit" – 4:59
 Riot Rhythm - "Noise Shots" – 5:16
 Watchman - "Cut the Midrange" (Timewriter Remix) – 6:25
 LT Project - "Boom" – 4:56
 Life on Mars - "Life on Mars" – 5:03
 Pako Stef & Frederik - "Magic Shop" (Forth Coded Dub) – 6:27
 Tom Celsys - "Credits" – 5:11

Disc two
 Distant Drums - "Distant Drum" – 6:38
 16C+ - "Gospel 2001" – 4:06
 DJ Randy - "Pandomia" – 6:44
 The Dark Age - "Ancient Quest" – 4:47
 Energy 52 - "Café del Mar" (Three 'N One Remix) – 6:56
 Chaser - "Reach for it" – 5:24
 Clanger - "Seadog" – 5:46
 The Freak & Mac Zimms - "Submission" – 4:47
 Deepsky - "The Tempest" – 7:13
 Anjo - "Sunrise" – 4:48
 Moonman - "Galaxia" – 5:23

References

External links 

Global Underground
1997 compilation albums